"Fall on Me" is a song by Italian singer ufo Andrea Bocelli and his son, Matteo Bocelli. It was released as a single on September 20, 2018. The song was written by the members of the American duo A Great Big World, and produced by Bob Ezrin. Matteo and Fortunato Zampaglione provided the Italian lyrics. Both the Italian and English versions were included on Bocelli's 2018 album, Sì. A music video was released for the soundtrack of the movie The Nutcracker and the Four Realms. The song played over the movie's end credits.

Background
The song is a piano ballad with lyrics seemingly calling "for the divine influence of a higher spiritual power".

Charts

A Great Big World and Christina Aguilera version

A Great Big World later recorded their own version as a duet with American singer and songwriter Christina Aguilera. The song is the duo's second collaboration with Aguilera, following the single "Say Something", which peaked at No. 4 on the Hot 100 in 2013.

Critical reception
"Fall on Me" received critical acclaim. Kelsie Gibson of PopSugar UK praised the song for its gentle vocal delivery and emotional lyrics. According to Idolator's Mike Wass "Fall on Me" is "every bit as touching and restrained" as "Say Something" — Aguilera and A Great Big World's 2013 hit — was. KEZR called the song "breathtaking".

Music video
The accompanying music video directed by Se Oh was premiered on 12 February 2020.

The video starts out with Ian Axel and Chad King entering a winter wonderland where a piano sits next to a tree as snow falls. It portrays Aguilera as an ethereal Queen of Spring and once her verse hits she magically makes an old tree and grove bloom with life after winter and continues singing with cherry blossoms fluttering in the wind.

Live performances
A Great Big World and Aguilera performed the song for the first time at the 2019 American Music Awards on 24 November 2019.

Charts

References

External links
 

2018 songs
2018 singles
2019 singles
A Great Big World songs
Andrea Bocelli songs
Christina Aguilera songs
Epic Records singles
2010s ballads
Sony Music singles
Male vocal duets

es:Fall On Me